Anaz Abdul Hadee (born 24 September 1983) is a Singaporean professional footballer who currently plays for Tampines Rovers in the S.League. He plays as a defender.

Career
Anaz Hadee has been involved in professional football since the age of 24. He started his S.League career with Woodlands Wellington and moved on to Balestier Khalsa in 2011.

In 2012, Anaz secured a lucrative contract to play for Tampines Rovers. He took up the offer and was rewarded with a Singapore Cup runners-up medal in that year, and S.League medals in the same year and consecutively in 2013.

Due to his exceptional performance, he was listed as one of the top 10 signings of the S.League in 2012.

References

External links

1983 births
Living people
Singaporean footballers
Association football defenders
Woodlands Wellington FC players
Balestier Khalsa FC players
Tampines Rovers FC players
Singapore Premier League players